Mississippi Highway 12 (MS 12) is a state highway in northern Mississippi that runs  west–east from MS 1 west of Hollandale at the Mississippi River to State Route 18 (SR 18) at the Alabama state line northeast of Columbus. MS 12 traverses three major regions of the state, the Mississippi Delta, the  North Central Hills, and the Golden Triangle.

Route description
MS 12 begins the Mississippi Delta region in Washington County at an intersection with MS 1 (part of the Great River Road) thirteen miles south of Greenville, not even a mile from the banks of the Mississippi River, and only five miles north of Lake Washington. The highway heads east through flat farmland as a two-lane highway to travel through Leroy Percy State Park, where it crosses Silver Creek Bayou, before entering Hollandale. MS 12 enters town along W Washington Street, makes a right in downtown onto East Avenue S, then left onto E Crouch Street to cross Deer Creek and come to an intersection with US 61. The highway now leaves Hollandale and continues east through rural farmland for several miles to cross the Sunflower River into Humphreys County.

MS 12 continues east through farmland for several miles to enter Belzoni and immediately come to an intersection between US 49W (unsigned MS 3) and MS 7 just west of downtown. The road continues as MS 7 (1st Street) into downtown while MS 12 becomes concurrent with US 49W/MS 3 and they head south as a four-lane to bypass downtown. MS 12 breaks off as a two-lane shortly thereafter and goes east to cross the Yazoo River to leave Belzoni. The highway continues east through rural farmland and woodlands for several miles to enter Holmes County.

MS 12 crosses Tchula Lake before traveling along the southern edge of Marcella and coming to an intersection and becoming concurrent with US 49E. They head northeast for a few miles to travel through Mileston before entering Tchula, with MS 12 splitting off and heading east just south of downtown. MS 12 climbs some Loess bluffs onto the North Central Hills region, passing in between the Morgan Brake National Wildlife Refuge and the Hillside National Wildlife Refuge. It now travels southeast through woodlands for several miles to enter Lexington.  The highway passes through neighborhoods before turning south and becoming concurrent with MS 17 at a Y-Intersection. MS 12/MS 17 continue along Carrollton Street through neighborhoods to enter downtown, with MS 12 splitting off along Depot Street at a Roundabout around the Holmes County Courthouse. The highway heads east to leave downtown to cross a creek and have an intersection with MS 836 (the new Lexington Bypass) before heading through a business district. It crosses another creek before leaving Lexington and traveling through some farmland and wooded areas for several miles, where it passes through Owen Wells, to have an interchange with I-55 (Exit 156) and entering Durant. MS 12 heads southeast through a business district before turning south along US 51 (N Jackson Street) through neighborhoods into downtown. MS 12 splits off along E Mulberry Street at the center of town, heading east to cross some rail road tracks to pass through more neighborhoods before leaving Durant and traveling through swamplands, crossing the Big Black River into Attala County.

MS 12 travels through a mix of farmland and wooded areas for the next several miles, passing through Sallis, where it has intersections with MS 429 and MS 431, and McAdams, before becoming concurrent with MS 43 and entering Kosciusko. The highway bypasses downtown along its western and northern sides, having intersections with MS 735, splitting off from MS 43, as well as having intersections with MS 19 and MS 35. MS 12 now leaves Kosciusko and heads northeast through woodlands to have an interchange with the Natchez Trace Parkway before traveling through Ethel, bypassing the town to the north while its business loop, MS 739, passes straight through downtown. The continues northeast through wooded areas for several miles to pass just west of McCool, where it has its first intersection with MS 407 (as well as with MS 411), before crossing into Choctaw County.

Between Kosciusko and Ackerman, MS 12 runs parallel to the Yockanookany River. MS 12 continues northeast through woodlands to travel through Weir, passing along the north side of town to have intersections with MS 413 and its second and final with MS 407, before entering Ackerman. The highway passes along the northern side of town, bypassing downtown as it travels through a business district and has intersections with MS 9, MS 15, as well as with its unsigned business loop MS 759 (W Main Street/College Street).  MS 12 now leaves Ackerman and winds its way east through remote, hilly, and wooded terrain for the next several miles to cross into Oktibbeha County. This section of the highway lies within the Tombigbee National Forest.

MS 12 now enters the Golden Triangle region and travels through Sturgis, Bradley, and Longview before entering Starkville to have an interchange with MS 25 in some neighborhoods. The highway widens to a four-lane undivided boulevard as it passes along the north side of George M. Bryan Airport and passes through a major business district on the south side of downtown. MS 12 makes a sharp curve to the north at an interchange with Bully Boulevard (unsigned MS 775), the main access into Mississippi State University. The highway now becomes a four-lane divided expressway, having interchanges with Collegeview Street and MS 182, before joining the US 82/MS 25 four-lane freeway. US 82/MS 12/MS 25 head east to leave Starkville and pass through Clayton Village, where it has another intersection with MS 182, before heading through farmland to cross into Lowndes County.

The freeway immediately has an interchange with US 45 Alternate, where MS 25 splits off, and US 82/MS 12 continues east to pass through Mayhew, and have an interchange with MS 791 (which provides access to Golden Triangle Regional Airport), prior to entering Columbus. The freeway has an interchange and becomes concurrent with US 45 before crossing a bridge over the Tombigbee River (part of the Tennessee Tombigbee Waterway) and bypassing downtown to the north, having interchanges with MS 182, MS 69 (where US 45 splits off and MS 50 joins the concurrency), as well as 18th Avenue N and Military Road, before crossing over Luxapalila Creek. MS 12/MS 50 split off the US 82 freeway at an interchange with Tuscaloosa Road, with them heading east through a business district as a four-lane boulevard, with MS 12 splitting off and heading north as a two-lane shortly thereafter. MS 12 leaves Columbus and travels northeast through farmland for the next several miles, where it crosses another bridge over Luxapalila Creek and passes through Woodlawn (as well as having intersections with Seed Tick Road and Caledonia-Vernon Road, both of which are county roads that lead to nearby Caledonia), before coming to the Alabama state line, with the road continuing east into Alabama as State Route 18 (SR 18).

Major intersections

References

External links 

Mississippi Highway Ends
Magnolia Meanderings
Mississippi Department of Transportation

012
Transportation in Washington County, Mississippi
Transportation in Humphreys County, Mississippi
Transportation in Holmes County, Mississippi
Transportation in Attala County, Mississippi
Transportation in Choctaw County, Mississippi
Transportation in Oktibbeha County, Mississippi
Transportation in Lowndes County, Mississippi